Nguyễn Thị Nga (born 9 May 1985) is a Vietnamese former footballer who played as a defender. She has been a member of the Vietnam women's national team.

International goals

References

1985 births
Living people
Women's association football defenders
Vietnamese women's footballers
Vietnam women's international footballers
Footballers at the 2010 Asian Games
Asian Games competitors for Vietnam
21st-century Vietnamese women